HMS Jumna was a Euphrates-class troopship launched at Palmers Shipbuilding and Iron Company at Hebburn on 24 September 1866. She was the third vessel of the Royal Navy to carry the name.

Design
Jumna was one of five iron-hulled vessels of the Euphrates class. All five were built to a design of 360 ft overall length by about 49 ft breadth, although Malabar was very slightly smaller than the rest of the class. They had  a single screw, a speed of 14 knots, one funnel, a barque-rig sail plan, three 4-pounder guns, and a white painted hull. Her bow was a "ram bow" which projected forward below the waterline.

She was commissioned jointly by the British Admiralty and the Indian government.

Identification
The Euphrates-class troopships could each be identified by a different coloured hull band.
The Jumnas hull band was red. The blue hull band of her sister Euphrates became the standard for all HM Troopships.

History

She spent most of her active career conveying British troops to and from the Indian subcontinent. In 1870 she transported The Connaught Rangers from India back to Britain.

She shipped back the York and Lancaster Regiment to England from Sudan 29 March to April 1884  In March 1886, she collided with the German steamship Hesperia in the Suez Canal but was not damaged.

Fate
In December 1902 she was still listed as HMS Jumna as she relieved HMS Caledonia as training ship for boys at Queensferry, taking the crew from that ship. A chart showing the moorings in the Firth of Forth adjacent to the Rosyth Naval Base in September 1918 has a mooring marked 'Jumna', and it is possible that this was HMS Jumna, serving as a coal hulk for the fleet.

She became the coal hulk C110 and was sold as the hulk Oceanic in July 1922.

Commanding officers

References

External links
 

 

Troop ships of the Royal Navy
Euphrates-class troopships
Barques
Ships built on the River Tyne
Victorian-era naval ships of the United Kingdom
Coal hulks
1866 ships
Maritime incidents in August 1883
Maritime incidents in March 1886